136–138 Collins Street is an architecturally distinguished Second Empire house in Hartford.  Built about 1870, it is a rare and well-preserved example of this style in the city.  It was listed on the National Register of Historic Places on April 29, 1982.

Description and history
136–138 Collins Street is located in Hartford's Asylum Hill neighborhood, on the north side of Collins Street east of Sumner Street.  It is a -story brick structure, with a slate mansard roof.  It is set on an elevated basement, giving it a taller than typical appearance.  It is three bays wide, with its entrance in the center bay, and a two-story projecting pavilion to its right.  The roof line is pierced by dormers in the mansard section that have elaborately carved surrounds and round-arch windows, that in the projecting section larger than the others. The latter dormer has a bellcast shape with a peaked hood. The roof the eaves have paired brackets.  Windows are set in rectangular openings, with peaked lintels and bracketed sills.

The house was built about 1870.  It probably had a more ornate front porch; the present one is a 20th-century replacement.  The house was once owned by Isaac Frisbie, the superintendent of Hartford's poorhouse, which was located behind the house.

See also
Building at 142 Collins Street
National Register of Historic Places listings in Hartford, Connecticut

References

Houses on the National Register of Historic Places in Connecticut
Second Empire architecture in Connecticut
Houses completed in 1870
Houses in Hartford, Connecticut
National Register of Historic Places in Hartford, Connecticut